Calliostoma carcellesi (Carcelle's top shell) is a species of sea snail, a marine gastropod mollusk in the family Calliostomatidae.

Description
The size of the shell varies between 20 mm and 24 mm.

Distribution
This marine species occurs off Argentina at a depth of about 50 m.

References

 Clench, W. J. and C. G. Aguayo. 1940. Notes and descriptions of new deep-water Mollusca obtained by the Harvard-Habana Expedition off Cuba. III. Memorias de la Sociedad Cubana de Historia Natural "Felipe Poey" 14: 77–94, pls. 14-16

External links
 To Biodiversity Heritage Library (1 publication)
 To Encyclopedia of Life
 To ITIS
 To World Register of Marine Species
 

carcellesi
Gastropods described in 1940